My Baby Is Black! (Original French title: Les lâches vivent d'espoir, "Cowards Live on Hope") is a 1961 French romantic drama film retitled for  exploitation release in the U.S. in 1965. The film was written and directed by Claude Bernard-Aubert and starred Françoise Giret, Gordon Heath and Aram Stephan, with music by Michel Magne. It was intended to examine society's view on race in the early 1960s.

Overview
In Paris, a white college student named Françoise gives birth to a black child. The events leading to the baby's birth are revealed, including the mother's courtship by a black medical student named Daniel and the horrors of bigotry that she faces as her family and peers turn their backs on her. In addition to the strong focus on the social taboo of interracial romance and sex, the film shows Daniel's experiences as a victim of racism in their neighborhood.

Originally a romantic drama with sociological undertones, the film was released in the United States as an exploitation film. It was advertised for its shock value and shown in drive-in theaters but was not particularly successful, as the product bore little relation to the exploitative picture promised by its advertising campaign

Cast
Gordon Heath as Daniel
Françoise Giret as Françoise
Aram Stephan as The Professor
Mag-Avril as The Concierge
Claude Berri as The Painter
Hervé Watine as The Guitarist
Fred Carault as Françoise's Father
Viviane Méry as Françoise's Mother

Critical reception
Allmovie called the film "More thoughtful and less exploitive than its American release title would lead one to expect."

References

External links
 

1961 films
Films about interracial romance
French black-and-white films
Films set in Paris
French romantic drama films
1961 romantic drama films
Films about racism in France
1960s French films